is a Japanese professional shogi player ranked 5-dan.

Early life
Sugimoto was born in Ōta, Tokyo on September 1, 1991. He learned how to play shogi from watching his father (an amateur 2-dan) play. As a sixth-grade student at Tamagawa Elementary School in 2003, Sugimoto won the 28th , defeating fellow future professional Takuya Ishida in the semi-finals.

Later in 2003, Sugimoto entered the Japan Shogi Association's apprentice school at the rank of 6-kyū as a student of shogi professional Kunio Yonenaga. He was promoted to the rank of 3-dan in 2008 and obtained professional status and the rank of 4-dan in April 2017 after finishing second to Nishida in the 60th 3-dan League (October 2016March 2017) with a record of 12 wins and 6 losses.

Promotion history
The promotion history for Sugimoto is as follows.
 6-kyū: September 2003
 3-dan: October 2008
 4-dan: April 1, 2017
 5-dan: July 8, 2021

References

External links
ShogiHub: Professional Player Info · Sugimoto, Kazuya

Japanese shogi players
Living people
Professional shogi players
Professional shogi players from Tokyo
1991 births
People from Ōta, Tokyo